Borisovsky Uyezd was one of the uyezds of Minsk Governorate and the Governorate-General of Minsk of the Russian Empire and then of Byelorussian Soviet Socialist Republic with its seat in Borisov from 1793 until its formal abolition in 1924 by Soviet authorities.

History
The uyezd was founded on April 23, 1793 after the Second Partition of Poland resulted in the annexation of the territory now in central Belarus.

Demographics
At the time of the Russian Empire Census of 1897, Borisovsky Uyezd had a population of 238,231. Of these, 80.9% spoke Belarusian, 11.2% Yiddish, 4.1% Polish, 3.1% Russian, 0.2% Ukrainian, 0.2% Lithuanian, 0.1% Latvian, 0.1% Tatar and 0.1% German as their native language.

References

External links 
 Sergei Prokudin-Gorsky photographs of locations in Borisovsky Uyezd 

 
Uezds of Minsk Governorate